Joseph Aoun (born 18 November 1933) is a Lebanese former sports shooter. He competed in the trap event at the 1964 Summer Olympics.

References

External links

1933 births
Living people
Lebanese male sport shooters
Olympic shooters of Lebanon
Shooters at the 1964 Summer Olympics
Place of birth missing (living people)